Briff Lane Meadows is a  biological Site of Special Scientific Interest north of Thatcham in Berkshire.

These meadows have unimproved traditionally managed grassland, a small stream, blackthorn dominated scrub, belts of woodland along the field edges and hedges. Most of the site is poorly drained and seasonally waterlogged, but there are dry areas which have large populations of cowslip, heath-grass, devil's-bit scabious and dyer's greenweed.

The site is private land with no public access.

References

Sites of Special Scientific Interest in Berkshire
Bucklebury